Atheta brunneipennis is a species of rove beetles native to Europe.

References

Staphylinidae
Beetles described in 1852
Beetles of Europe